Momoka (written: 杏果, 百夏, 桃花 or 桃華) is a feminine Japanese given name. Notable people with the name include:

, Japanese singer
 (born 1995), Japanese idol and singer
, Japanese idol from Magical² and Girls²
, Japanese footballer 
Momoka Kobori (born 1999), New Zealand golfer
, Japanese woman para-alpine skier

Fictional characters:
, a main female character in the anime series Touka Gettan
, character in the manga series Keroro Gunso
, character from Magical x Heroine Magimajo Pures!

Japanese feminine given names